Gunnersbury Boys' School is a Roman Catholic Secondary School for boys with specialist Science College status. It is situated in Brentford, London. The school was founded in 1932 by Fr William Roche.

Academic performance

In 2019, the school's GCSE results were above average compared to the national and local authority figures. 69% of pupils achieved Grade 5 or above in English & maths GCSEs. Pupils' progress was "well above average" and the school's Attainment 8 score was also above average. The proportion of pupils entering the English Baccalaureate was higher than average.

Inspection judgements

As of 2020, the school's most recent Ofsted inspection was in 2009, with the judgement of Outstanding.

Notable former pupils

Gunnersbury Grammar School 
 Tony Slattery, comedian, actor
Richard O'Sullivan, actor
Jamie Kensit, guitarist of band Eighth Wonder
Nick Knowles, presenter
Marland Yarde, rugby player
Kieran Campbell, rugby player
Terry O’Neil, photography
David Adeleye, (Professional boxer)

References

External links 
 

Boys' schools in London
Catholic secondary schools in the Archdiocese of Westminster
Secondary schools in the London Borough of Hounslow
Educational institutions established in 1919
1919 establishments in England
Voluntary aided schools in London
Brentford, London
Specialist science colleges in England